World War II: When Lions Roared (also known as Then There Were Giants) is a 1994 American war television miniseries, directed by Joseph Sargent, and starring Michael Caine, John Lithgow and Bob Hoskins as the three major Allied leaders, Stalin, Roosevelt and Churchill respectively.  
It was notable as the first video production to be produced in high-definition video for broadcast in the United States, using the Sony HDVS line of analog high-definition equipment, although it was broadcast by the NBC television network in standard NTSC resolution.

Plot 
The film portrays Roosevelt, Churchill, and Stalin as they maneuver their countries through several of the major events of World War II - such events include the Blitz, Operation Barbarossa, the bombing of Pearl Harbor, the North African Campaign, the Allied invasion of Italy, the Tehran Conference, and the Yalta Conference. The Big Three discuss Operation Overlord in Tehran, and the formation of the United Nations and the future of Poland at Yalta. The film concludes with the death of Roosevelt and the end of the war in Europe.

In particular, the focus is on the relationship between the leaders themselves and the large strategic concerns at play, with little scrutiny given to the decisions taking place at a lower level - an example of this is how, despite his personal disdain for communism, Churchill was willing to go to great lengths to aid the Soviet Union in their fight against Nazi Germany.

Cast 
Michael Caine as Joseph Stalin
John Lithgow as Franklin D. Roosevelt
Bob Hoskins as Winston Churchill
Ed Begley Jr. as Harry Hopkins
Jan Triska as Vyacheslav Molotov
Corey Burton as Radio News Announcer

Awards 
It was nominated for 6 Emmy Awards, including Best Actor for Michael Caine, but only won for Outstanding Individual Achievement in Lighting Direction (Electronic) for a Drama Series, Variety Series, Miniseries or a Special.

Home media 
Certain UK home versions used an edited version of the film running at 115 minutes, under the alternate title of Then There Were Giants. The complete film was released on a two-disc DVD set on February 13, 2007.

References

External links 
 World War II: When Lions Roared at Rotten Tomatoes
 World War II: When Lions Roared at the Internet Movie Database

1990s American television miniseries
1994 television films
1994 films
Films set in the 1940s
Films directed by Joseph Sargent
Films scored by John Morris
1990s English-language films
NBC network original films
Films about Winston Churchill
World War II television series